Love Island is a 1952 American film directed by Bud Pollard starring Paul Valentine and Eva Gabor. Originally released in Cinecolor, the film uses extensive footage taken in Bali used from the film Legong: Dance of the Virgins (1935). It was the final directorial effort of Bud Pollard who had previously directed several race films and exploitation films.

Plot summary 
US Navigator Lt Taber relates the account of his parachuting from his damaged plane onto the island of Tuba Tara ("Love Island" in English).  He falls in love with one of the local beauties and fights for her.

Cast 
Paul Valentine as Lt. Richard Taber
Eva Gabor as Sarna
Malcolm Lee Beggs as Uraka, Sarna's suitor
Frank McNellis as Aryuna, Sarna's father
Dean Norton as Tamor, Sarna's friend
Kathryn Chang as Klepon
Bruno Wick as Ninga
Richard W. Shankland as Fumanku, high priest
Howard Blaine as Capt. Blake
Vicki Marsden as Stewardess

Soundtrack 
 Across the Sea
Written by Jerry Bragin
Love at First Sight
Written by Jerry Bragin
Sung by Paul Valentine

DVD release
The film was released on DVD on 21 March 2005.

See also
Goona-goona epic

External links

1952 films
1952 romantic comedy films
Cinecolor films
American romantic comedy films
Films shot in Indonesia
Films set on islands
1950s English-language films
1950s American films